The United States Army Europe Band and Chorus a musical component of the United States Army, composed of army musicians who serve under the USAREUR. It is currently based in the German city of Sembach, being subordinated to the Headquarters Battalion, USAREUR, in Wiesbaden. Its components include a 100+ concert and ceremonial ensemble. It is currently under the musical command of Major Randall S. Bartel. The band members enter the band as musicians while singers are selectively chosen through Army auditions. The combined band and chorus perform in 200+ events per year all over the European continent.

Brief History 
The USAREUR Band dates back to December 1940, when the unit was first constituted on the 16th of that month. It was raised as the 367th Infantry Band. It was officially activated on March 25, 1941 in Louisiana and was re-designated in June of the next year as the 364th Infantry Band. It was reorganized again twice in the following three years, lastly as the 448th Army Band which was deactivated in early 1947. The band was re-established on June 25, 1949 in Mannheim, Germany as the 33rd Army Band under the command of USAREUR. It moved to the headquarters of USAREUR (Wiesbaden) in 1952, where it was given its current name. Its original purpose was to support USAREUR and represent the United States Army in the North Atlantic Treaty Organization (NATO). On 27 October 1981, the band and Soldiers' Chorus were combined under the direction US Army Europe Public Affairs Office and have since performed together as a single unit.

Notable performances

Band Command Team 
 Band Commander: Major Randall S. Bartel
 Band Executive Officer: Captain Taylor Criswell 
 Assistant Bandmaster: Chief Warrant Officer Richard Chapman
 Band Sergeant Major: Sergeant Major Lori Nix

Structure 

 Band Command Team
 Musical Performance Teams
 Concert Band
 Ceremonial Band
 Marching Band
 Soldiers' Chorus
 Dixieland Band
 Jazz Combo
 Woodwind Quintet
 Brass Quintet

Concert Band 

The concert band specializes in the playing of classical music during indoor performances. It is currently the largest ensemble in the USAREUR Band, employing 60 musicians. To date, the concert band performs at local concert halls, municipal centers, and theatres all over the continent.

Ceremonial Band 
The Ceremonial Band supports the United States Army Europe in ceremonial settings and events which can include Change of command, memorial services, military parades, and other stationary outdoor events. The 30 member unit is notable for representing the USAREUR and the United States at Armistice Day and Victory in Europe Day celebrations that are observed by NATO/European Union nations.

Soldiers' Chorus 
The Soldiers' Chorus is the flagship ensemble of the USAREUR Band. It was founded on April 24, 1967 as the 7th Army Soldiers Chorus originally being assigned to the office of the Adjutant General's office at USAREUR HQ. The group is composed of vocalists who perform music which ranges from Pop music to Broadway music. Their main purpose is to entertain American troops, alongside perform for diplomatic guests.

Dixieland Band 
The Dixieland Band consists of 6 musicians who perform traditionally popular American songs from a specific time period in the United States.

See also 
 United States Army Band
 United States military bands
 United States Air Forces in Europe Band
 United States Naval Forces Europe Band
 United States Army Europe

References

External links 

Official Website
Official Youtube Channel
U.S Army Europe Band and Chorus

Bands of the United States Army
United States military in Germany
Military units and formations established in 1940
Military bands located outside their country of origin